The Real McCoy was a ferryboat that operated for 63 years from Rio Vista, California on the Ryer Island Ferry route as part of California State Route 84, and was the oldest and most reliable piece of equipment owned by the California Department of Transportation.  During its operating life – making the trip  24 hours per day, 7 days per week and roughly 200 trips a day – totaling approximately 460,000 safe passages over the 800 foot gap in the Sacramento River delta, between Ryer Island and Rio Vista.

It was replaced in 2011 by the Real McCoy II.

Notes

Ferries on the California highway system
Steamships of the United States
Transportation in Solano County, California
1945 ships